100D may refer to:
100D- Artist & engineer @_100D
 Canon EOS 100D DSLR camera introduced in 2013
 Tesla Model S 100D, all-electric sedan
 Tesla Model X 100D, all-electric cross-over SUV (XUV/CUV)
 Atlas 100D, the rocket used in Mercury-Atlas 3

See also
 D100 (disambiguation)
 100 (disambiguation)